Big Alcove Spring is a hot spring in Norris Geyser Basin, Yellowstone National Park in the United States.

References 

Geothermal features of Yellowstone National Park
Geothermal features of Park County, Wyoming
Hot springs of Wyoming
Bodies of water of Park County, Wyoming